Luis Edgardo Contreras Reyes (born 27 October 1982) is a Salvadoran former professional footballer who played as a goalkeeper. He made six appearances for the El Salvador national team from 2014 to 2016.

Club career 
Nicknamed El Motor, Contreras played his entire career in El Salvador. He played for FAS (two spells), Águila, Sonsonate, Chalatenango, and Isidro Metapán. In April 2020, he was released from Isidro Metapán.

International career 
Contreras made his debut for the El Salvador national team in 2014, and was selected for the 2015 CONCACAF Gold Cup squad. He made a total of six appearances for his home country.

Honours 
FAS

 Primera División de Fútbol de El Salvador: Clausura 2002, Apertura 2002, Apertura 2003, Apertura 2004, Clausura 2004, Apertura 2009

Notes

References 

1982 births
Living people
Salvadoran footballers
Association football goalkeepers
C.D. FAS footballers
C.D. Águila footballers
C.D. Sonsonate footballers
C.D. Chalatenango footballers
A.D. Isidro Metapán footballers
Primera División de Fútbol Profesional players
El Salvador international footballers
2015 CONCACAF Gold Cup players